The Riviera Line is the railway between the city of Exeter, towns Dawlish and Teignmouth, and the English Riviera resorts of Torbay in Devon, England. Its tracks are shared with the Exeter to Plymouth Line along the South Devon sea wall. It is part of the Network Rail Route 12 ( to ).

History

After the company had completed its main line to Plymouth, it opened a branch from Newton Abbot to Torquay (the present Torre railway station) on 18 December 1848.

These lines were built as single-track,  broad gauge railways by Isambard Kingdom Brunel. They were designed for atmospheric power and, although this was only used from 13 September 1847 until 9 September 1848, the remains of several of the South Devon Railway engine houses used for the stationary engines can still be seen by the side of the line. The track was converted to standard gauge on 21 May 1892. Double track was laid in sections over a period of several years, requiring the widening or removal of several tunnels near Teignmouth.

The Dartmouth and Torquay Railway was operated from the outset by the South Devon Railway and amalgamated with it in 1872. This company, in turn, amalgamated with the Great Western Railway on 1 February 1876. The GWR was nationalised on 1 January 1948 as part of British Railways.

In 1977, the Parliamentary Select Committee on Nationalised Industries recommended considering electrification of more of Britain's rail network and, by 1979, BR presented a range of options to do so by 2000. Some included electrifying the Bristol to Exeter line, Exeter to Plymouth Line, Riviera Line and Cornish Main Line. Under later governments, the proposal was not implemented. At present, there are no proposals to electrify the line or any others in Devon or Cornwall.

From December 2009, their services only operated east of Exeter St. Davids.

Services
Local passenger services on the line are currently operated by Great Western Railway. Mondays-Saturdays see an approximately half-hourly service calling at most stations, which runs beyond Exeter to and from  along the Avocet Line. On Sundays, a more restricted service operates, most of which terminate at Exeter.

Infrastructure

Trains going towards Paignton are described as travelling in the "down" direction; those towards Exeter in the "up". The line is double track throughout except for a long single-lead junction at Newton Abbot where trains are turned off the main line onto the Paignton branch. Loops at  allow slower trains to be overtaken, as does the flexible layout at Newton Abbot where all three platforms can access the Paignton branch. At Exeter St Davids, Riviera Line trains generally use platforms 1 and 3 as these allow access to and from Exeter Central and the Avocet line; starting or terminating trains may also use platforms 4, 5 and 6.

Multiple aspect signals are controlled from the panel signal box at Exeter and allow a headway between trains of four minutes from there to Newton Abbot and seven minutes onwards to Paignton. The sea wall section is signalled for trains to run either way on the up (landward) line to allow for restricted working in the event of sea damage to the down line.

The Paignton branch has been identified as a "fragile route" where the addition of any further loco hauled traffic would have a significant impact on the residual life of track and/or structures. The three stations on the branch are currently under consideration for the provision of improved facilities but this is dependent on third-party funding being made available.

Route description
The route is described from Exeter to Paignton for a passenger facing the direction of travel, which will put the sea on their left.

Exeter to Newton Abbot
Communities served: Exeter – Starcross (and Exmouth via a seasonal ferry service) – Dawlish Warren – Dawlish – Teignmouth – Newton Abbot

On leaving , the line crosses the River Exe and a parallel flood relief channel, then passes above the suburbs of Exeter along a stone viaduct on which is situated Exeter St Thomas railway station.  The church of St David with its spire, and the older Exeter Cathedral, can be seen on the hill above the river.  Beyond this is an industrial area where two lines used to branch out. On the left a short line went down to the Exeter Canal at City Basin; on the right a longer branch ran to Heathfield on the Newton Abbot to Moretonhampstead branch.

Once out in the countryside our line crosses marshes as it runs alongside the canal and river.  What looks like a level crossing in the fields near Countess Wear is actually a lifting bridge across the canal.  After passing the site of Exminster railway station the canal comes more clearly into view on the left and joins the River Exe, as does the railway, at Turf. The square pond next to the line is the site of Turf engine house. This stretch of the line used to have long water troughs between the rails from which steam locomotives could refill their water tanks without stopping.

From Powderham Castle the railway is right alongside the river; on the right of the line is the castle's deer park, while on the left, across the river, trains on the Avocet Line may be seen near Lympstone Commando railway station. Our train now enters the village of Starcross; beyond Starcross railway station is the pier for the Exmouth to Starcross Ferry and the old Starcross engine house.

A little further along the river the railway crosses the mouth of Cockwood harbour. Dawlish Warren now comes into sight; the sand dunes are home to a nature reserve where many wading and sea birds can be seen. The railway line opens out into four lines at Dawlish Warren railway station, where the platforms are alongside loop lines that allow fast trains to overtake stopping services.

On the left is the beach and seaside amusements; on the right are some camping coaches in the old goods yard.  The railway now comes onto the Sea Wall which it shares with a footpath, although it quickly enters the short and deep cutting at Langstone Rock. Emerging above the beach, views can be had across the sea towards Torbay.

Approaching Dawlish railway station, Coastguard's Cottage is on the right. Although now a café, this building was used by the railway during its construction and then sold to the coastguard. Their boat house is below the footbridge. The town can be seen off to the right from Colonnade Viaduct at the other end of the station.

The line now enters its first tunnel, the  Kennaway Tunnel beneath Lea Mount, beyond which is Coryton beach where the footpath along the Sea Wall ends, and then  Coryton tunnel. The next beach is the private Shell Cove and then the railway passes through  Phillot Tunnel and  Clerk's Tunnel, emerging onto a section of sea wall at Breeches Rock before diving into  Parson's Tunnel beneath Hole Head. The last two tunnels are named after the Parson and Clerk Rocks, two stacks in the sea off Hole Head. When the tunnel was dug the workers cut into a smugglers tunnel which ran from a hidden entrance above the cliff down to a secluded cove.

Beyond Parson's Tunnel is a short viaduct across Smugglers Lane and then the footpath resumes alongside the line for the final stretch of the Sea Wall past Sprey Point to the cutting at Teignmouth Eastcliff. On the right side of the railway near Sprey Point can be seen the remains of a lime kiln used during the construction of the line.

The railway passes through to Teignmouth railway station then continues through a cutting to emerge behind Teignmouth Harbour, after which the railway resumes its course alongside the water, the River Teign. The cuttings on both sides of the station were originally tunnels and were opened out between 1879 and 1884. The railway passes under the Shaldon Bridge and then follows the river past the small promontories at Flow Point, Red Rock, and Summer House, opposite which can be seen the waterside inn at Coombe Cellars.

After leaving the riverside the line crosses Hackney Marshes and passes between the railway sidings at Hackney Yard (left), and the race course and former Moretonhampstead branch (right). The industrial area to the left of Newton Abbot railway station is the site of the South Devon Railway Company locomotive workshops – the older stone buildings are the only surviving railway buildings.

Newton Abbot to Paignton
Communities served: Newton Abbot – Torquay – Paignton

Leaving Newton Abbot the railway widens out to four tracks; the two for Penzance diverge to the right at Aller Junction while the two for Paignton pass through the concrete beam 270m long Aller Tunnel, constructed in 2015 to carry the new South Devon Highway. From here the Riviera Line trains climb and then slowly descend towards the sea at Torquay.  First though, they pass through the remains of the former Kingskerswell railway station.

Just before Torre railway station the line curves through a cutting; the Torquay engine house still stands on the top of the cutting on the right. The stone building on the left is the old goods shed, while sidings for coal traffic were situated on the opposite side of the line.  The disused signal box on the eastbound platform was unusually tall to allow the signalman to look over the footbridge to see trains approaching up the steep gradient.

The train now descends this to reach Torquay railway station opened in 1859, although today's large stone buildings and old signal box date from 1878. Unlike the original Torquay station (now Torre), this one is right by the beach at Abbey Sands and a level promenade links it with the harbour and town centre.

On leaving the station the line passes beneath an ornamental cast iron bridge, through a small cutting, and then climbs alongside Livermead Beach to the site of Torquay Gas Works, now a park on the right of the line. It then passes a headland at Preston before dropping down again into Paignton, with more views of the beaches and sea. Immediately outside Paignton railway station is a busy level crossing right in the town centre. The ticket office is now situated in the 1859 goods shed; the bus station is right outside the front door while the Dartmouth Steam Railway is situated alongside on the other side of the station.

Passenger volume
Traffic growth in recent years has been largely on the main line section between Exeter and Newton Abbot, although reduced in 2014 due to the Dawlish seawall breach.

The statistics are for passengers arriving and departing from each station and cover twelve-month periods that start in April.

Plans
In 2009 the Association of Train Operating Companies identified Brixham as one of fourteen towns for which the provision of a new railway service would have a positive benefit-cost ratio. This would be an extension of the Great Western Railway service beyond Paignton to Churston station on the Dartmouth Steam Railway, which would then act as a railhead for Brixham.

South West Coast Path
The South West Coast Path is the longest national trail in the United Kingdom and the Riviera Line runs alongside it for much of its length. The Path crosses the River Exe on the ferry to Starcross station and then follows the road to Dawlish Warren where it joins the Sea Wall to Dawlish. It then climbs up onto the cliffs above Kennaway Tunnel before rejoining the Sea Wall at Parsons Tunnel to follow the line to Eastcliff at Teignmouth.

It again follows closely from Abbey Sands (by Torquay station) to Preston Sands at Paignton. It also follows alongside the Dartmouth Steam Railway from Goodrington to Broadsands, the beach near Churston railway station.

The Path thus gives opportunities to observe trains at close hand, and also provides links for linear walks between stations, including .

Storm damage

The sea wall has always been prone to damage during stormy weather as it runs alongside the open sea at the base of cliffs for four miles. The first time this occurred was in September 1846, just a few months after the line opened. The most recent closure was in 2014 when a major breach at Dawlish closed the line from 4 February until 14 April 2014.

References

Sources and further reading

Scenic railway lines in Devon and Cornwall
Rail transport in Devon
Transport in Exeter
Railway lines in South West England
7 ft gauge railways
Standard gauge railways in England